Giorgio Marincola (23 September 1923 – 4 May 1945) was a Somali-Italian partisan who was killed in the last days of the Second World War.  He is believed to be the only Somali to have earned the Gold Medal of Military Valour, Italy's second highest military award for gallantry.

Biography 

Born in Somalia to an Italian father, Giuseppe Marincola (1891–1956), and a Somali mother, Aschirò Hassan (1901–?), he was brought to Italy with his sister, Isabella Marincola (1926-2010) in 1926 and initially sent to Calabria to live with his paternal uncle and aunt. In 1933, he came to Rome to live with his father and sister and began middle school.  During Marincola's stay in the South, his father had married and he had two new siblings, Rita (born 1928) and Ivan (born 1929).

Legacy 

On 2 October 1952, signed by decree of the Prime Minister Alcide De Gasperi, Giorgio Marincola was posthumously awarded the Gold Medal of Military Valour. The citation for the award reads:

In the summer of 2020, in the wake of the protests triggered by the Black Lives Matter movement, Mayor Virginia Raggi proposed a record in the Capitoline Assembly, which was approved, to name an under construction station of the Rome Metro (later renamed) after Marincola.

References 

1923 births
1945 deaths
Italian resistance movement members
Italian anti-fascists
Members of Giustizia e Libertà
Resistance members killed by Nazi Germany
Italian civilians killed in World War II
Italian people of Somali descent